The Winnebago Tribe of Nebraska is one of two federally recognized tribes of Ho-Chunk Native Americans. The other is the Ho-Chunk Nation of Wisconsin. Tribe members often refer to themselves as Hochungra – "People of the Parent Speech". Their language is part of the Siouan family.

Reservation
The Winnebago Reservation was established by a treaty on March 8, 1865. It is located in Thurston and Dixon counties, Nebraska, and Woodbury County, Iowa. In 1990, 1,151 tribal members lived on the reservation.

Government
The Winnebago Tribe of Nebraska is headquartered in Winnebago, Nebraska. The tribe is governed by a democratically elected general council. 

The current administration is as follows:

 Chairwoman: Victoria Kitcheyan
 Vice-Chairman: Brian Chamberlain
 Treasurer: Rona Stealer
 Secretary: Lorelei DeCora
 Council Member: Louis Larose
 Council Member: Isaac Smith
 Council Member: Kenny Mallory
 Council Member: Coly Brown
 Council Member: Aric Armell

Language
The Winnebago Tribe speaks English and Ho-Chunk, which is a Chiwere-Winnebago language, part of the Siouan-Catawban language family.

Economic development

Ho-Chunk, Inc. is the tribe's corporation; it provides construction services, professional services, and business and consumer products. The Winnebago Tribe also owns and operates the WinnaVegas Casino Resort, hotel, and Flowers Island Restaurant and Buffet, all located in Sloan, Iowa.

Notable tribal members
 Joba Chamberlain (b. 1985), Major League Baseball pitcher
 Angel De Cora (1871–1919), artist, educator, and Indian rights activist
 Terri Crawford Hansen (b. 1953), journalist
 Henry Roe Cloud (1884–1950), educator, college administrator, US federal government official, Presbyterian minister; first full-blood Native American to attend Yale College
 Lillian St. Cyr, known as Red Wing (1884–1974), an actress of the silent film era
 Frank LaMere (b. about 1950 – June 16, 2019), activist, advocate, politician
 Renya K. Ramirez (b. 1959), anthropologist, author, and Native feminist
 John Raymond Rice (April 25, 1914 – September 6, 1950), U.S. Army in service of UN Forces in Korean War
 Lexie Wakan LaMere (May 16, 1992 – January 3, 2014), first native to graduate from Senate Page school; youngest delegate in the Nebraska Democratic Party

See also
 Ho-Chunk religion
 Little Priest Tribal College

Notes

References
 Pritzker, Barry M. A Native American Encyclopedia: History, Culture, and Peoples. Oxford: Oxford University Press, 2000.

External links
 Official Winnebago Tribe of Nebraska website
 Ho-Chunk, Inc., economic development arm of the Winnebago Tribe of Nebraska
 Constitution of the Winnebago Tribe, Winnebago Reservation, in the State of Nebraska

 
Native American tribes in Nebraska
Federally recognized tribes in the United States
Populated places in Thurston County, Nebraska
Populated places in Woodbury County, Iowa
Populated places in Dixon County, Nebraska
Native American tribes in Iowa